WHIV-LP is a community radio station on 102.3 FM in New Orleans, Louisiana, covering the Mid-City area. It is owned by the New Orleans Society for Infectious Disease Awareness (NOSIDA) and broadcasts from studios on Orleans Avenue and a transmitter atop the Tulane Tower office complex.

History

In March 2014, the New Orleans Society for Infectious Disease Awareness, formed five years prior to raise HIV/AIDS awareness in the New Orleans area, received a construction permit for a new low-power (LP) FM radio station, which it announced would feature a community format with "programming dedicated to human rights and social justice". The selection of the call letters was intended by its founders to help reduce the stigma surrounding HIV; in 2016, New Orleans had the third-highest HIV infection rate in the United States, attributed to cultural stigmas in the Black community, local laws and high poverty rates.

WHIV-LP began broadcasting on December 1, 2014—World AIDS Day. Originally with a talk-heavy lineup that drew heavily from the Pacifica Radio Network, the station expanded its music programming in 2016 and had 70 different hosts and DJs by 2017.

Originally housed at the Odyssey House drug treatment center, WHIV-LP moved to its own quarters on Orleans Avenue in 2015. Less than a year later, the station suffered major damage in the 2016 Louisiana floods, with several pieces of equipment and furnishings being ruined.

Other uses of the call letters

A fictional radio station named WHIV is mentioned in New Orleans writer Poppy Z. Brite's 1996 novel Exquisite Corpse, though there is no relation to the present station. In that book, WHIV is a pirate radio station on a boat from which an HIV-positive character, Lucas Ransom, broadcasts.

References

External links

 

WHIV-LP
Low-power FM radio stations in Louisiana
2014 establishments in Louisiana
Radio stations established in 2014